This is a list of South African television-related events in 2015.

Events
10 March – SABC reporter Vuyo Mvoko is mugged live on camera as he is about to present a report from outside Johannesburg's Milpark Hospital about the health of Zambian President Edgar Lungu, who had been admitted to the clinic for tests following a collapse two days earlier.
17 May - Ace Khumalo and Ntombi Tshabalala win the fourth season of Big Brother.
7 August - Afrikaans singer Karlien van Jaarsveld and her partner Devon Snell win the eighth season of Strictly Come Dancing.
8 November - 3-year-old DJ Arch Jnr wins the sixth season of SA's Got Talent.
22 November - Karabo Morgane wins the eleventh season of Idols South Africa.

Television shows

1980s
Good Morning South Africa (1985-present)
Carte Blanche (1988–present)

1990s
Top Billing (1992–present)
Generations (1994–present)
Isidingo (1998–present)

2000s
Idols South Africa (2002–present)
Rhythm City (2007–present)
SA's Got Talent (2009–present)

Ending this year
Strictly Come Dancing (2006-2008, 2013–2015)
Takalani Sesame (2000-2015)

See also
2015 in South Africa

References

 
2015 in South Africa